Datuk Abdullah Hussain ,  (25 March 1920 – 31 December 2014) was a Malaysian novelist and writer. He received the Malaysian National Laureate in 1996 which made him the 8th recipient of the award.

Early years
Abdullah was born on 25 March 1920 in Sungai Limau Dalam, Yan, Kedah. Between the years 1926 and 1931 he received his early education at the Sekolah Melayu Sungai Limau and continued his studies at Sekolah St. Michael Alor Setar from 1932 until 1933 and also at the Anglo Chinese School, Alor Setar until 1935.

Career
Abdullah started his career as an assistant cashier in the mining industry in Pahang in 1939. In the same year, he moved to Penang to start work for the newspaper Sahabat. During this time, he released two writings titled Binti Penghulu and Harta Dan Jodoh Menanti di England which was featured in Sahabat. During the years 1940 to 1941, Abdullah worked as an assistant writer for the newspaper Saudara and released two novels, Kasih Isteri and Dia...Kekasihku.

Death
Abdullah died on 31 December 2014 at his residence in Section 17, Petaling Jaya, Selangor, age of 90. He was buried in Bukit Kiara Muslim Cemetery, Kuala Lumpur.

Publications

Awards
1981 S.E.A. Write Award
1992/1994 Hadiah Novel Nasional from Syarikat Utusan Melayu and Public Bank Berhad
 1994/1995 Hadiah Sastera Malaysia for the novel Imam
1995 Pingat Jasa Hukom Ngon Adat Lembaga Adat Kebudayaan Aceh (LAKA) and Hadiah Sako
1996 The Sasterawan Negara, Darjah Dato' Setia Diraja Kedah (DSDK) and Darjah Kebesaran Panglima Jasa Negara (PJN)

References

External links
1981 S.E.A. Write Awards
Abdullah Hussain recalls the Merdeka struggle
Abdullah Hussain lindungi karyanya
Penerima Anugerah Sasterawan Negara, Perpustakaan Negara Malaysia

1920 births
2014 deaths
Malaysian novelists
People from Kedah
Malaysian people of Acehnese descent
Malaysian people of Malay descent
Malaysian Muslims
S.E.A. Write Award winners
20th-century novelists
Malaysian National Laureates